Del Carmen, officially the Municipality of Del Carmen (Surigaonon: Lungsod nan Del Carmen), is a 5th class municipality in the province of Surigao del Norte, Philippines. According to the 2015 census, it has a population of 18,392 people. The municipality was formerly called Numancia until 1966 when it was changed to its present name. It is located on Siargao Island and home to Sayak Airport, the island's main airport.

Geography

Barangays
Del Carmen is politically subdivided into 20 barangays.

Climate

Demographics

Economy

Education
Surigao State College of Technology - Del Carmen Campus

See also
List of renamed cities and municipalities in the Philippines

References

External links

 Del Carmen Profile at PhilAtlas.com
   Del Carmen Profile at the DTI Cities and Municipalities Competitive Index
 Municipality of Del Carmen, Siargao Islands, Surigao del Norte, Philippines
 [ Philippine Standard Geographic Code]
 Philippine Census Information
 Local Governance Performance Management System 

Municipalities of Surigao del Norte